Grzegorz Więzik (21 July 1963 – 26 December 2021) was a Polish professional footballer who played as a midfielder. He was the father of footballer Jakub Więzik. He died on 26 December 2021, at the age of 58.

References

External links

1963 births
2021 deaths
Polish footballers
Association football midfielders
People from Żywiec County
Podbeskidzie Bielsko-Biała players
Dyskobolia Grodzisk Wielkopolski players
Viborg FF players
Silkeborg IF players
FC Mulhouse players
1. FC Kaiserslautern players
ŁKS Łódź players
Ikast FS players
SV Eintracht Trier 05 players
Polish expatriate footballers
Polish expatriate sportspeople in France
Expatriate footballers in France
Polish expatriate sportspeople in Germany
Expatriate footballers in Germany